Otra Vez ("again") may refer to:

 Otra Vez, an album by Carlos Mata, 1986
 Otra Vez, an album by MDO (band), 2005
 Otra Vez, an album by Pandora (musical group), 1986
 Otra Vez, an album by Sandy & Papo, 1997
 Otra Vez, an album by Vicente Fernández, 2011
 ¡¿Otra Vez?!, an album by Luzbel, 1989
 "Otra Vez", a song by Miranda!, 2004
 "Otra Vez", a song by Víctor García (Mexican singer), 2003
 "Otra Vez", a song by Zion & Lennox, 2016
 "Otra Vez", a song by Prince Royce, 2022